The Manchurian reed warbler (Acrocephalus tangorum), also known as the Manchurian reed-warbler, is a species of marsh-warbler (family Acrocephalidae). It was formerly included in the "Old World warbler" assemblage, and was usually (and sometimes is still) treated as a subspecies of the paddyfield warbler (A. agricola).  It is found in Cambodia, China, Hong Kong, South Korea, Laos, Russia, Thailand, Vietnam, Malaysia and possibly Myanmar. Its natural habitat is swamps. It is threatened by habitat loss.

References 

Acrocephalus (bird)
Birds of Manchuria
Birds described in 1912
Taxonomy articles created by Polbot